Juan José María Santa Cruz (born 12 September 1979) is a Chilean lawyer and politician. He served as the Ministry General Secretariat of the Presidency from 2021 to 2022. In 2018, he was appointed by Sebastián Piñera as Undersecretary of Justice and in 2020 was appointed as General Undersecretariat of the Presidency.

References

External links
 

1979 births
Living people
Chilean people
Pontifical Catholic University of Chile alumni
Alumni of the London School of Economics
21st-century Chilean politicians
National Renewal (Chile) politicians